Mamadou Maiga (born 10 February 1995) is a Malian football player who plays in Russia for Pari Nizhny Novgorod.

Club career
He made his debut in the Russian Football National League for FC Veles Moscow on 8 August 2020 in a game against PFC Krylia Sovetov Samara, as a starter.

On 30 June 2022, Maiga signed a three-year contract with Russian Premier League club FC Pari Nizhny Novgorod.

Personal life
Maiga acquired citizenship of Russia in November 2021.

Career statistics

References

External links
 
 Profile by Russian Football National League

1995 births
21st-century Malian people
Russian people of Malian descent
Naturalised citizens of Russia
Living people
Malian footballers
Russian footballers
Association football midfielders
FC Veles Moscow players
FC Nizhny Novgorod (2015) players
Russian First League players
Russian Premier League players
Malian expatriate footballers
Expatriate footballers in Russia